The ACA Hurricane was an electro-mechanical and rotating-directional, 130dB civil defense siren, created and produced by Alerting Communicators of America (ACA). ACA began manufacturing the Hurricane 130 in 1968, and began production in 1981. The Hurricane 130 is very similar to the Federal Signal Thunderbolt series and was also meant to compete with the Federal Signal Thunderbolt.

History

The ACA Hurricane 130 was designed by James E. Biersach of Alerting Communicators of America and presented at a Civil Defense convention in November 1968. They introduced other sirens, however, this utilized new fibreglass casting techniques, never before used by any other company. It was available in dual tone 8/10, 10/12, 8/12 port, or single tone 8, 10, or 12 port configurations, but most models were equipped with an 8/10 chopper port ratio (similar to a Major Third). It was meant to compete with Federal Signal's Thunderbolt siren series at the time. The Hurricane started off with a square horn (similar to the Federal Signal Thunderbolt), but ended with two throats where the horn attaches to the chopper enclosure. Additionally, the Hurricane siren was a supercharged mechanical siren, utilizing a blower and high output chopper similar to the Federal Signal Thunderbolt. These were produced until 1973 when a larger, rounded horn was made, that was a true exponential horn. This siren was popular with towns looking for a high output 130dB siren.

Later on, ACA opted to change the design of the Hurricane to make it stand out from the Thunderbolt siren, and to also avoid any potential lawsuits over the two similar designs. Aside from that, they decided to correct some design flaws that were discovered in the original model. These changes to the design include a pole-mounted vertical blower, the controller was removed from blower assembly and housed in its own cabinet, and most notably, the horn changed from rectangular to circular. This model was dubbed the "Hurricane 130 MKII" by the company. It also utilizes a 30-horsepower blower motor, as opposed to the 7.5-horsepower blower motor on the Federal Signal Thunderbolt.  The company continued production until 1980, when the Hurricane was replaced with the Penetrator P-50, a 50-horsepower, dual-tone, 135 dB siren. All versions of the ACA Hurricane are very rare, with the Square-Horn being the most rare out of all of them. Most of them have been replaced by newer sirens, as it is getting harder to find parts for the Hurricane.

Technical information

Cities that had/use the Hurricane 130 Model

References

http://civildefensemuseum.org/sirens/hcane/station3b.jpg

http://www.civildefensemuseum.com/sirens/sirenpx4.html

http://www.civildefensemuseum.com/sirens/manuals/Hurricane_130_MK2.pdf

http://www.civildefensemuseum.com/sirens/manuals/Hurricane_130_Manual.pdf

Sirens
1968 introductions